Nazirul Naim bin Che Hashim (born 6 April 1993) is a Malaysian professional footballer who plays for Malaysia Super League club Kuala Lumpur City as a left-back.

Born in Kuala Kangsar, Nazirul has earned an early education at Clifford Secondary School in Kuala Kangsar before he furthered his study in Bukit Jalil Sports School and began his football career there. Nazirul later progressed through the national youth set-up in Harimau Muda B and Harimau Muda A.

Club career

Harimau Muda
Born and raised in Kampung Sayong Lembah, Kuala Kangsar, Nazirul was absorbed into the Harimau Muda B programme squad when he was 17 years old. They were competing in the Malaysia Premier League. Earlier he was part of the Bukit Jalil Sports School team who has won the President Cup in 2010.

The following year Nazirul started playing for Harimau Muda A. They were competing in the Malaysia Super League as he made 14 league appearances during his season debut. In 2012, the team joined Singaporean S.League. Nazirul made 17 appearances in the 2012 S.League season.

F.C. Ryūkyū
On 25 March 2013, Nazirul signed a one-year contract with Japan Football League club F.C. Ryūkyū after a 2-week trial. Nazirul's contract with the club was, however, terminated prematurely due to him being plagued by injuries, and without playing in any official matches, he returned to Harimau Muda A.

Perak
On 2 December 2015, it has been announced that Nazirul signed a contract with Malaysia Super League side Perak from Harimau Muda after the program was disbanded by Football Association of Malaysia on November.

On 13 February 2016, Nazirul started in his first match for Perak in a 0-0 home draw against Kelantan.

International career

Youth
Nazirul has represented the Malaysia national team in many levels. At youth level, he was part of the Malaysia U-17 squad and Malaysia U-23 team.

Senior
Nazirul made his senior Malaysia national team debut coming on as a substitute for Zubir Azmi in a scoreless friendly against Bangladesh on 29 August 2015 at Shah Alam Stadium.

Career statistics

Club

International

Personal life
Nazirul was married to a part-time model, Nor Wahila Ali Tarmizi on 18 September 2016.

Honours

Club
Perak
 Malaysia FA Cup runner-up: 2019
 Malaysia Super League runner-up: 2018
 Malaysia Cup: 2018

International
Malaysia
 AFF Championship runner-up: 2018

References

External links
 

1993 births
Living people
Malaysian people of Malay descent
People from Perak
Malaysian footballers
Malaysia international footballers
Malaysian expatriate footballers
Malaysian expatriate sportspeople in Japan
Expatriate footballers in Japan
FC Ryukyu players
Malaysia Super League players
Perak F.C. players
Sabah F.C. (Malaysia) players
Kuala Lumpur City F.C. players
Association football fullbacks
Footballers at the 2014 Asian Games
Asian Games competitors for Malaysia